Work! is an album by jazz pianist Mulgrew Miller, recorded together with Charnett Moffett on bass and Terri Lyne Carrington on drums. The album was recorded on April 23–24, 1986 and released that year by Landmark Records. The album is named after the song "Work" by Thelonious Monk and Sonny Rollins from their 1954 album Thelonious Monk and Sonny Rollins.

Reception
Scott Yanow of Allmusic noted: "Made about the time he left Art Blakey's Jazz Messengers to go out on his own, Mulgrew Miller's second date as a leader matches his modern mainstream modal style with bassist Charnett Moffett and drummer Terri Lyne Carrington. Once again, the repertoire is a mixture of Miller originals, jazz standards ("Without a Song," "Powell's Prances" and Thelonious Monk's "Work") and an unaccompanied piano solo ("My Man's Gone Now"). And once again, the set is recommended to fans of 1980s/'90s jazz piano".

Track listing

Personnel
Band
 Mulgrew Miller – piano, composer 
 Charnett Moffett – bass 
 Terri Lyne Carrington – drums

Production
Phil Carroll – art direction
George Horn – mastering
Orrin Keepnews – liner notes, producer
Chuck Stewart – photography

References

1986 albums
Landmark Records albums
Albums produced by Orrin Keepnews
Mulgrew Miller albums